Habib Haddad (born 1980) is a serial entrepreneur and early stage investor. He is currently the president and managing director of the E14 Fund that invests in spin-offs from MIT. Investments include ThruWave, Formlabs, Kiwi, Figur8, Affectiva, Wise Systems. Haddad has founded a number of tech companies including Wamda, Yamli (Yahoo! licensed the technology in 2012), YallaStartup, and others.

He has also been an activist on various social issues in the Middle East, specifically in Lebanon.

He has been named by the World Economic Forum as a Young Global Leader in 2009 and as a top innovator under 35 (TR35) by the MIT Technology Review. Haddad's work in the MENA region is credited with playing a key role in strengthening its entrepreneurship ecosystem.

Education 
Haddad holds a Bachelor of Computer and Communication Engineering from the American University in Beirut and a master's degree in electrical engineering from the University of Southern California.

Career 
Haddad is currently the president and managing director of the E14 Fund that invests in spin-offs from MIT such as Formlabs, Affectiva, Soofa, TulipSystems and others.

In 2004, Haddad was a founding engineer at an image based modeling software company Mok3 (now Everyscape) as a venture backed spinoff from MIT CSAIL, where he served until 2005 and joined ATI as a senior software engineer.

In 2006, he founded Relief Lebanon to support relief efforts during the 2006 war in Lebanon. The grass root effort was featured by the "101 Stories to Tell" initiative by the UNDP in February 2009.

In 2007, Haddad founded Yamli, the leading Arabic transliteration and smart search engine (Patent issued on Method and system for adaptive transliteration US 20090144049 A1). In 2012, Yahoo! acquired a license to Yamli's technologies. Yamli has been praised for empowering and re-energizing the Arabic language online.

In 2009, Haddad along with two other Middle East technology entrepreneurs, founded, YallaStartup, a non-governmental organization that aims to foster early stage entrepreneurship and startup creation. It was one of the first support organizations for MENA Entrepreneurs.

In 2011 he co-created Alive.in, a website that brought 1000 volunteers to transcribe and translate voicemails from the Egyptian protesters after the government shutdown of the internet. He started the company when Google and Twitter launched a project to allow people to leave a voice mail that will be then put on Twitter, Haddad came up with an idea to crowd source translation of those voices in real time from Arabic to other languages.

From 2012 to 2016, he was the founding CEO of Wamda, a platform of programs and networks that aims to accelerate entrepreneurship ecosystems across the MENA region. He also served as a venture partner of Wamda Capital, a growth capital VC fund, with investments in startups like taxi-hailing app Careem and LittleBits

Awards 
 2009: The World Economic Forum recognized Haddad as a Young Global Leader. 30 under 30 Most Powerful Arabs, Arabian Business.
 2011: Named as a Top Innovator under 35 (TR35) by the MIT Technology Review. 
 2009, 2015: Distinguished Alumni Award, American University of Beirut. 
 2013: The Arab Thought Foundation awarded him the "Arab Creativity Award". The same year the American University Beirut honoured the entrepreneur as a distinguished alum. 
 2012: Young Entrepreneur Award, Takreem 
 2015: Most powerful 100 Arabs under 40, Arabian Business.
 2016: American University of Beirut counts him among 150 AUB History Makers for the university's 150-year anniversary.

Leadership 
 Member of the Technology Pioneers selection committee of the World Economic Forum (2013–present)
 Co-Chair World Economic Forum Summit on the Middle East & North Africa (2011)
 Vice Chair of the Global Agenda Council on Entrepreneurship (2013), Member of to the Global Agenda Council on Innovation (2014–2015) – World Economic Forum
 Member of the World Economic Forum Global Future Council on Systems and Platforms (2016–present)
 Academy Member, Global Teacher Prize
 Advisory Board Member, Faculty of Engineering and Architecture, American University of Beirut

References 

1980 births
Living people
University of Southern California alumni
American University of Beirut alumni
Businesspeople from Beirut